Bamboo is a group of woody plants in the true grass family Poaceae.

Bamboo may also refer to:

Geography
 Bamboo, Jamaica, a village
 Bamboo, Queensland, a locality in Australia
 Bamboo Forest (Kyoto, Japan), also called the Arashiyama Bamboo Grove or Sagano Bamboo Forest
 Bamboo Key, a coral island in the Florida Keys National Marine Sanctuary
 Zhuzilin station (English translation: Bamboo Forest station), a station of Shenzhen Metro Line 1 in Futian District, Shenzhen, China

People
 Bamboo (rapper), Kenya emcee
 Bamboo Mañalac (born 1976), Filipino singer and former band vocalist

Arts, entertainment, and media
 Bamboo (album), 1996 album by Pierre Estève
 Bamboo (Filipino band), Filipino rock band
 Bamboo (British band)
 Bamboo (book), collection of non-fiction works by Scottish writer William Boyd
 Bamboo (1945 film), Spanish comedy
 Bamboo (2023 film), an Indian Marathi-language drama film
 Bamboo (production act), UK house music project
 "Bamboo," a song by Dave Van Ronk from the 1961 album Van Ronk Sings
 "Bamboo", a song by Joe Satriani from the 2004 album Is There Love in Space?
 "Bamboo," a song by OutKast from the 2003 album Speakerboxxx/The Love Below

Other uses
 Bamboo (elephant), Asian elephant
 Bamboo Airways, an airline in Vietnam
 Bamboo (software), continuous integration software from Atlassian
 Bamboo (unit), an obsolete unit of measurement

See also
 Bamboo blossom
 Bamboo Club, a chain of nightclubs
 Bamboo Engineering, a British auto racing team
 Bamboo processing machine
 Bamboo torture
 Bambu (disambiguation)
 Bambuseae
 Ceremonial pole
 International Network for Bamboo and Rattan
 List of bamboo species
 Lucky bamboo, Dracaena sanderiana, a species of flowering plant that is not actually bamboo
 The Bamboos (disambiguation)
 Wacom Bamboo, a graphic tablet produced by Wacom
 Yellow Bamboo, a Bali-based martial art and white magic cult